"Perfect Skin" is the first single from the 8th studio album Angels of Finnish rock band The 69 Eyes, released in 2007 through Virgin Finland.

The video for Perfect Skin was filmed in Hollywood in October 2006 and was directed by Ralf Strathmann.

The live tracks on the single were recorded at a sold out Whisky A Go-Go show in Hollywood in March 2006. The venue was also the place they recorded their very first live album The 69 Eyes: Hollywood Kills.

Track listing
Perfect Skin - 3:45
Devils (live) - 4:27
Christina Death (live) - 4:33
I Just Want To Have Something To Do (live) (Ramones cover) - 3:14
Website extras included as Enhanced CD content

References 

2007 singles
Number-one singles in Finland
2007 songs
Virgin Records singles